Mahwelereng is a township in the Mogalakwena Local Municipality of the Waterberg District Municipality of the Limpopo Province of South Africa. It is about 2 km from Mokopane. The township is a product of Apartheid South Africa's policies in the former Bantustan of Lebowa. Most of the original residents of Mahwelereng were from an area which old residents call "Ol' Location". Ol' Location was too close to town and the residents had to be moved further away from town. There are still remnants of Ol' Location such as the "Bar" and the Lutheran Church Mission on the Sekgakgapeng site. The township is bordered by Sekgakgapeng, Mountainview, Moshate, Phola Park and Ga-Madiba.

Background
The township grew rapidly as a result of urbanisation, as it afforded job opportunities in an area largely surrounded by rural settlements. The lack of affordable housing stock has also led to an increase in informal housing. The name Mahwelereng (meaning place of Mohwelere trees) is derived from the name of a tree referred to in the Northern Sotho language as "Mohwelere".

It was a well-planned township with a sound infrastructure. The water drainage system was comparable to that of most towns, and there are lights on every street. However, the township lacks tarred roads and a reliable electricity supply. Roads are maintained with gravel mined locally next to the current Mahwelereng Stadium, known as "Lekgethe".

The original housing units comprised two-, four- and five-room houses and a few seven-room houses. These sections gave rise to the names for these particular areas. The "Di-Five" area has larger houses reserved for high-ranking government employees. Most of these five-room houses had 2 bedrooms, a lounge/dining room, a kitchen, and a toilet. Over time, however, some of the original houses were demolished by the owners to make room for larger homes; this was most often done by government employees who received housing subsidies. The "Di-Four" area has predominantly four-room houses, which included two bedrooms, a lounge/dining room, a kitchen and a toilet on the outside; some were flush toilets and some were not. The "Di-Two" area has a mix of four-room houses and two-room houses. The two-room houses had one bedroom and one kitchen-cum-lounge-cum-bedroom, with a non-flush toilet on the outside. Di-Two had a notorious section called Phadima Section.

The locals mainly speak Northern Sotho but a significant number also speak  Xitsonga and a Ndebele dialect.

Landmarks
Hotel Mahwelereng was an entertainment and meeting place for the higher echelons of society. Neighbouring the hotel was a popular bottle store that attracted patronage from surrounding areas, and a bar selling traditionally brewed liquor patronised by older and poorer members of society. The hotel has since been closed down as the owner was in tax arrears. However, the building remains standing.

Mokopane Hospital, originally named Refilwe Hospital, is one of three hospitals in Mokopane and the surrounding area; the other two are Voortrekker and George Masebe hospitals. The hospital is supported by a network of small community clinics.

Mahwelereng Stadium, which was built mainly to accommodate soccer activities, has been used as a multi-purpose venue.
Sefakaola Mountain forms part of the Waterberg mountain range.

Business 
The Central Business District, also called "Dišopong" by locals, is the main shopping district for the area situated next to Hotel Mahwelereng. Most shop owners who were removed from the Old Location started afresh here. It housed a dairy store, butchery, a fruit and vegetable market, supermarkets, bookshop, doctors' surgery, pharmacy, post office, community hall and some government offices. The Central Business District has since been weakened by the geographic expansion of the community and the proliferation of informal home-run shops referred to by locals as Spaza shops. Young entrepreneurs have taken over, running braai butcheries ("shisanyama"), hair salons and cash loans; however, as the main town of Potgietersrus is only 2 km away, most of these businesspeople have a small income. As of May 2021 the township have Mahwelereng Shopping Center next to Gadone filling station.

Education 
During the Bantustan times, Mahwelereng was one of the centres of education within Lebowa. The Mokopane Teachers Training College, renamed Mokopane College of Education, is located here. Most of the teachers in the province of Limpopo graduated from this college. It was built in an area called Di-Five by the locals, but in 1991 it moved to newly built premises next to the Mokopane Hospital. It was later converted to a Further Education and Training College.

Schools in Mahwelereng include the primary schools Nomalema, Ithuteng, Raphela, Nonchimudi, ND Mokonyane, Maakamaleka and Segoakgala LP, and the high schools Ebenezer, Gojela, DG Tsebe, and E.D.L Rampola and Fred Ledwaba Comprehensive School.

Like many townships in Limpopo Province, Mahwelereng has produced some of the most dynamic leaders in South Africa (Mosibudi Mangena AZAPO president). Many of these leaders have not returned to revive an area that is increasingly stagnating in a backlog of basic municipal services.

Sporting activities 
Of all the sporting teams in Mahwelereng, the softball team Mahwelereng Spikes is the biggest success story. The team was established by local youngsters, and over the years this softball team has provided many young people with a place to belong, and an opportunity to develop confidence and leadership skills.

Vultures Cricket Club dominates the district as far as Modimolle and had potential Protea players such as Samuel Manganya, who was a skilled left-hander and showed no mercy to bowlers. Even with players such as Manganya, the team could not sustain the club due to the lack of infrastructure and of necessary support from their local government.

Mahwelereng is the home of the now defunct Mahwelereng Real Rovers, which was formed in 1975 and later promoted to the Premier Soccer League (PSL).

There are other sporting activities in the area including boxing, karate, dancing and music. The musical band Sefakaola (named after the local mountain) entertains people with live music every weekend at the traditional central business district, Dišopong.

References

External links 
 Research done on non-motorised transport in the area (animal-drawn vehicles in particular)
 Rural transport and women
 Mogalakwena Municipality official website (Mahwelereng is part of the municipality)

Populated places in the Mogalakwena Local Municipality
Townships in Limpopo